Ge may be:
One of the Jê languages of Brazil
The Gejia language of China